Clubhouse may refer to:

Locations
 The meetinghouse of:
 A club (organization), an association of two or more people united by a common interest or goal
 In the United States, a country club
 In the United Kingdom, a gentlemen's club
 A Wendy house, or playhouse, a small house for children to play in
 The locker room or changing room for a sports team, which at the highest professional level also features eating and entertainment facilities
 A community centre, a public location where community members gather for group activities, social support, public information, and other purposes

Film and TV
 "Clubhouses" (South Park), a  season 2 South Park episode
 Clubhouse (TV series), an American drama television series from 2004
 Mickey Mouse Clubhouse, a Playhouse Disney TV series from 2006

Music
 Club house music, a form of house music played in nightclubs
 Club House (band), an Italian dance-music band
Clubhouse (album), a Dexter Gordon album

Other
 Clubhouse Games, or 42 All-Time Classics, a compilation game for the Nintendo DS
 Clubhouse Model of Psychosocial Rehabilitation, a program of support and opportunities for people with severe and persistent mental illnesses
 Clubhouse sandwich
 Clubhouse (app), a mobile audio-chat social networking app
 Clubhouse Software, the former name of the company Shortcut Software

See also